François Clément Joseph Parent (1823–1884) was a French architect.  Among his work was the castle at Ooidonk.  With his brother Henri Parent, he restored the châteaux of Ancy-le-Franc for the Clermont-Tonnerre, Esclimont and Bonnetable families.  One of his pupils was the Hungarian Ödön Lechner.

References

External links
Belgian Castles

1823 births
1884 deaths
19th-century French architects